Jorissen is a Dutch surname meaning "son of Joris", equivalent to English Georgeson. Notable people with the surname include:

 Adriaen Jorissen Thienpoint, Dutch explorer
 E. J. P. Jorissen (1829-1912), Dutch lawyer and politician

Dutch-language surnames
Surnames of Belgian origin
Patronymic surnames
Surnames from given names